First Affair is a 1983 American made-for-television romantic drama film directed by Gus Trikonis, starring Melissa Sue Anderson, Loretta Swit, and Joel Higgins.

Plot 
18-year-old Toby King (Melissa Sue Anderson) arrives as a freshman at Harvard University on a full scholarship. A small-town girl from Nebraska, she is overwhelmed by her co-students. Her roommates are Cathy (Kim Delaney), a Boston native who dreams of becoming a Broadway actress, Karen (Amanda Bearse), a gifted student with an excellent record, and the shy Debbie (Robin Morse). Karen convinces Toby to join the university newspaper for extra credits; here she meets Robert (Charley Lang), who soon develops a crush on Toby. Toby is jealous of her co-students, who live a careless life and are not as affected by the pressure for good marks; Toby constantly worries about losing her scholarship and has difficulty integrating with the other students.

Despite the pressure, Toby accepts a parttime job offer from her literature professor Jane Simon (Loretta Swit) to babysit her children, Jenny (Amanda Helfen) and Collin (Jay Ine). While babysitting, Toby meets and immediately falls for Jane's 40-year-old husband Greg Simon (Joel Higgins), a successful architect who recently has grown tired of his wife after having been married with her for over 16 years. Greg develops a crush on Toby and starts taking her out. Before long, a love affair develops. Toby starts to fall in love with Greg and becomes torn between doing the right thing and following her heart. Ultimately, Jane catches them in the act and kicks Greg out of the house. He decides to try and save his marriage, leaving behind Toby heartbroken. As time passes, she gradually gets over Greg and is forgiven by Jane for her actions.

Cast
Melissa Sue Anderson as Toby King
Loretta Swit as Jane Simon
Joel Higgins as Greg Simon
Kim Delaney as Cathy
Amanda Bearse as Karen
Robin Morse as Debbie
Charley Lang as Robert
Robert Curtis Brown as Donald
Diane Shalet as Claire King
Amanda Helfen as Jenny Simon
Jay Ine as Collin Simon

Video/DVD
First Affair was released on VHS by CBS Fox Home Video in 1987.

References

External links

1983 television films
1983 films
American romance films
CBS network films
Films set in Harvard University
Films directed by Gus Trikonis
1980s English-language films
1980s American films